Buli is an Austronesian language of southern Halmahera, Indonesia.

References

South Halmahera–West New Guinea languages
Languages of Indonesia
Maluku Islands